Paxton is a village in the Hunter Region of New South Wales, Australia. At the 2016 census, Paxton recorded a population of 942.

The Austar coal mine is located nearby.

References

Suburbs of City of Cessnock